Elnur Aslanov, born January 15, 1977, Baku, Azerbaijan, is an Azerbaijani political scientist and author, businessman, known for his books, “New world order and national development strategy”, published in 2006  and "Modernization and national development", published in 2015.

Professional career 

Dr. Aslanov is former Head of e-Government Development Department (before - Strategic planning, Scientific potential and Investment department) at the Ministry of Transport, Communication and High Technologies of the Republic of Azerbaijan since April 2014. Dr. Aslanov was a Member of Advisory Board of High Technologies Park of Azerbaijan. Previously, from 2007 till 2014, he served as a Head of Political Analysis and Information Department of the Administration of the President of the Republic of Azerbaijan. Before that, from 2001 to 2007, he served as Senior Advisor to the Head of Administration of the President of the Republic of Azerbaijan.

In this role, as a Head of the Political Analysis and Information Department in the Administration of the President of Azerbaijan, Dr. Aslanov was leading the work on state political strategies and analysis and wrote extensively on subject of state-building and how Azerbaijan managed to build in less than a generation a modern, secular and democratic nation, from the ruins of seven decades under Soviet rule.  In 2011, he wrote an answer to a letter, allegedly written by a  thirteen-year-old girl from Nagorno-Karabakh Adeline Avagimyan, asking the President of Azerbaijan Ilham Aliev why he wants Karabakh and why he keeps talking of military options. In his answer, he invited Adelina to visit Baku, Ganja, Sumgayit and other districts of Azerbaijan, to see their development, new appearance and see how much Armenia is losing by occupying Nagorno-Karabakh.

In his capacity as a political scientist, Elnur Aslanov has given talks at numerous international conferences and authored more than 100 scholarly publications on the subject of international security and international relations. He also published close to 200 of his articles and opinion papers in electronic and print media on the subject of national ideology, foreign policy of the State, and modernization issues.

Elnur Aslanov also authored a book on subject of two very distinguishable phenomena that are often used interchangeably by many scholars, titled "Modernization and national development" (Baku, 2015). His hypothesis based on the idea, that the process of modernization is based on social, economic and political factors that have developed the entire human society through the ancient days. At the same time, Dr. Aslanov underlines, that national development implies economic growth. With that in mind, in his book Dr. Aslanov states, that major relationship that exists between the two phenomena – modernization and national development – is that both are concerned with the growth of the economy.

Dr. Aslanov known for his position toward unresolved Nagorno-Karabakh conflict between Armenia and Azerbaijan, and his criticism of mechanisms and double standards on international political space:

Elnur Aslanov is also known for his research on subject of mobilization of information technology as an important tool in fostering national competitiveness in the context of a rapidly changing global economy. 

In his interviews and talks as a quest lecture at local universities, Elnur Aslanov advocated the idea, that IT promotes good governance by increasing transparency, information, and accountability, by facilitating accurate decision-making and public participation, and by enhancing the efficient delivery of public goods and services.

Dr. Aslanov in his position as a Head of e-Government Development Department (before - Strategic planning, Scientific potential and Investment department) at the Ministry of Communication and High Technologies of the Republic of Azerbaijan oversaw e-Government strategies in Azerbaijan, that can be implemented by government organizations, state agencies and public sector organizations for strategic planning and transformational purposes.

Elnur Aslanov holds PhD degree in Political science, M.A. in International Affairs, as well as Master of Theological Studies. He speaks several languages.

In 2016-2017 Elnur Aslanov graduated Harvard Business School.

Currently he is CEO and Regional Director of the international construction and investment group.

Elnur Aslanov is owner and co-founder of the various IT and Internet projects. Elnur Aslanov was founder of the different news agencies and Internet TV.

Articles and OpEds

 Beynəlxalq hüququn prinsiplərinin icrasına yenidən baxılmasına ehtiyac varmı? 
 Waving The Banner Of Azerbaijan's New Oil Boom 
 Advice For Armenia On Resolving The Karabakh Dispute 
 Справедливый путь к идеальному миру 
 Асланов: «Лучше поздно, чем никогда…» 
 Elnur Aslanov. How to deal with UN Security Council? 
 Эльнур Асланов. Как быть с СБ ООН? 
 Эльнур Асланов: «Лучше поздно, чем никогда…» 
 Bakı -Tbilisi -Ankara geosiyasi üçlüyü dünya miqyasında ciddi beynəlxalq oyunçudur 
 «Азербайджанские ученые должны быть известны не только в своей стране, но и за ее пределами» 
 Azerbaijani official says bilateral ties with Turkey unshakable 
 Шахматная стратегия Ильхама Алиева 
 Эльнур Асланов: «Сегодня против Азербайджана ведется настоящая сетевая война» 
 Дружба и братство Азербайджана и Турции опираются на волю двух братских народов - Эльнур Асланов 
 Azerbaycan ve Türkiye ilişkilerinin geleceği 
 E.Aslanov: “Azərbaycanın öz ərazisi üzərində yurisdiksiyasını bərpa etməsinə heç kim qarışa bilməz" 
 Администрация Президента АР прокомментировала заявление командира 102-й российской базы в Армении 
 Армения превратилась в «раковую опухоль» региона – Администрация Президента АР 
 Elnur Aslanov: “Terrorun nə dini, nə də milləti var” 
 Эльнур Асланов. Опусы журналистики из туманного Альбиона - абсурд или провокация? - МНЕНИЕ 
 «Истинная суть выборов в Азербайджане» 
 Elnur Aslanov Zori Balayanın məktubuna münasibət bildirdi 
 Senior Azerbaijani official sees improved democracy at home 
 Azərbaycan hazırda bölgənin internet mərkəzidir 
 Azerbaijan is center of internet in the region - official 
29 лет попыток наладить диалог по Нагорному Карабаху ни к чему не привели, конфликт достиг апогея 
2020 год станет отправной точкой для глобальных перемен, которые только начались  
Невосприимчивость к привычной рекламе – уникальная черта нового поколения, а ведь она будет касаться и политической   
На Ближнем Востоке стираются с лица земли жемчужины мировой цивилизации. Но это не приковывает внимания общественности, как пожар в Нотр-Даме  
Как показывает практика, "экономическое чудо" Азербайджану обеспечивает подход открытого диалога между властью и гражданами 
Эльнур Асланов. 2020 – pandemic, самоизоляция, Brexit, Карабах, победа

References

External links
 Complete list of articles and other digital publications (including interviews, speeches and op-eds) by Elnur Aslanov available from his blog http://elnuraslanov.livejournal.com

Personal web-page: https://www.elnuraslanov.com

Azerbaijani political scientists
Writers from Baku
1977 births
Living people